Naberezhny is a rural locality (a settlement) in Khatukayskoye Rural Settlement of Krasnogvardeysky District, Adygea, Russia. The population was 92 as of 2018. There are 3 streets.

Geography 
Naberezhny is located 11 km north of Krasnogvardeyskoye (the district's administrative centre) by road. Khatukay is the nearest rural locality.

References 

Rural localities in Krasnogvardeysky District